Santiago Ramos may refer to:

 Santiago Ramos (actor) (born 1949), Spanish actor
 Santiago Ramos (racing driver) (born 2004), Mexican racing driver